Machias is a hamlet and census-designated place (CDP) in the northeast part of the town of Machias, in Cattaraugus County, New York, United States. As of the 2010 census, it had a population of 471. Prior to the 2010 census, the area was delineated as part of the Lime Lake-Machias CDP.

Geography
Machias village is located in the northeast part of the town of Machias and comprises the developed center of the town. It is bordered to the north by the community of Lime Lake. Ischua Creek, a tributary of the Allegheny River, forms the southern edge of the CDP.

New York State Route 16 runs through the center of Machias, leading north  to Delevan and south  to Franklinville.

Demographics

References

Census-designated places in New York (state)
Hamlets in Cattaraugus County, New York
Hamlets in New York (state)